The Reckoner Trilogy is a young adult, fantasy book series written by David Robertson, published October 10, 2017 by HighWater Press. The series includes Strangers (2017), Monsters (2018), and Ghosts (2019).

Reception

Reviews 
Strangers received positive reviews from School Library Connection, The Horn Book Magazine, and Kirkus Reviews. 

Monsters received a five-star review from CM: Canadian Review of Materials, as well as positive reviews from CanLit for LittleCanadians and Kirkus Reviews. 

Ghosts received a five-star review from CM: Canadian Review of Materials, as well as positive reviews from The Globe and Mail, BCTF Magazine, and Quill & Quire.

Awards and honors 
CBC Arts named Monsters one of the best young adult and middle-grade books of 2018 and Ghosts of the best young adult and middle-grade books of 2019.

References

External links 
 David Alexander Robertson on Strangers

Fantasy novel trilogies
Book series introduced in 2017
21st-century Canadian novels
English-language books
Canadian fantasy novels
Canadian young adult novels
Young adult fantasy novels
Young adult novel series